The , , is a breed of beef cattle indigenous to the Pyrenees of north-eastern Spain. It is distributed mainly in the autonomous communities of Navarre and the Basque Country, but is present in much of the northern part of the country. It is well adapted to the mountainous terrain and humid climate of the area. It came close to extinction in twentieth century, but is not now at risk.

History 

The origins of the Pirenaica are uncertain. In the past it was the predominant cattle breed of northern Spain. A herd book was opened in Gipuzkoa in 1905, the first of its kind in Spain; in 1925 a herd book was opened in Navarre also. However, from about the turn of the twentieth century, large-scale importation of Braunvieh cattle from Switzerland began to threaten the breed; while at first these were pure-bred, they soon began to be cross-bred with the Pirenaica to improve meat and milk yield. In 1912 a census of cattle in Gipuzkoa found about 50,000 head, of which less than 40% were pure-bred Pirenaica stock; the remainder were Braunvieh and Braunvieh-Pirenaica crosses, in roughly equal proportions. In 1954 there were 18,000 head, but by the 1970s the Pirenaica was close to extinction. In 1974 it had disappeared from the Basque Country, with the exception of about 40 head in Gipuzkoa; in Navarre about 1500 head remained, of which about 1000 were in the valley of Aezkoa.

At the end of 2014 the total population was recorded as 40,026, of which 34,806 were female and 5,220 were male. Of these, about 50% were in Navarre and 25% in the Basque Country; there were substantial populations in Aragón, Cantabria and Castilla León, and smaller numbers in Catalonia, the Comunitat Valenciana, Extremadura, La Rioja, Madrid and the Principado de Asturias.

The Pirenaica is classified among the "autochthonous breeds in development" by the Ministerio de Agricultura, Alimentación y Medio Ambiente, the Spanish ministry of agriculture, and thus not at risk of extinction.

Use and management 

The Pirenaica was formerly a triple-purpose breed, used as a draught animal and for milk and meat production. While breeding selection is now wholly towards meat production, Pirenaica oxen may sometimes be used in the traditional rural sport of arrastre de piedra, or stone-dragging.

References 

Cattle breeds
Cattle breeds originating in Spain
Cattle breeds originating in France
Basque domestic animal breeds